"Minor Earth Major Sky" is a song by Norwegian band A-ha, released as the second single from their sixth studio album of the same name (2000). The single was serviced to European radio stations around 5 June 2000 and was released commercially in Norway and Germany on 10 July.

Music video
The music video for "Minor Earth Major Sky" was directed by Philipp Stölzl and filmed in an abandoned mine near Pilsen, Czech Republic. In the video, the three band members portray astronauts in a moon landing. Morten Harket goes off by himself, leaving the others waiting for him; when he returns, he finds they've already launched the lunar module without him. The theme of the video is based on reality; Paul and Magne often complained that Morten would be late to every meeting and concert and interview. In this video, they thought it would be fun to leave him behind.

The suits worn by A-ha in the video were reproductions of real lunar suits; they had been originally used in the 1995 film Apollo 13.

Track listings
German CD maxi single
"Minor Earth Major Sky" (Niven's Radio Edit) – 4:02
"Minor Earth Major Sky" (Black Dog Mix) – 4:07
"Minor Earth Major Sky" (Millenia Nova Remix) – 4:29
"Minor Earth Major Sky" (Ian Pooley's Deep Mix) – 6:16
"Minor Earth Major Sky" (ATB Club Remix) – 5:47
"Minor Earth Major Sky" (Early Version) – 5:10
"Minor Earth Major Sky" (Album Version) – 5:24

German 12-inch single
A1. "Minor Earth Major Sky" (Ian Pooley's Deep Mix) – 6:16
A2. "Minor Earth Major Sky" (Ian Pooley's Toothache Mix) – 6:59
B1. "Minor Earth Major Sky" (ATB Club Remix) – 5:47
B2. "Minor Earth Major Sky" (Pumpin' Dolls Club Mix) – 8:08

Charts

References

2000 singles
2000 songs
A-ha songs
Songs written by Magne Furuholmen
Songs written by Paul Waaktaar-Savoy
Warner Music Group singles